The table below shows the 1989 WTA Tier I Series schedule.

Singles

See also 
 WTA Tier I events

See also 
 1989 ATP Tour
 1989 WTA Tour

External links
 Official WTA Tour website